"Ooh!" is a song by American recording artist Mary J. Blige, taken from her sixth studio album, Love & Life (2003). It was written by Blige, Sean Combs, Dimitri Christo, and Hamilton Bohannon, while production was helmed by Combs and D-Nat. Sampling interpolations of the 1991 hip-hop classic, "I Gotta Have It" by Ed OG, which itself sampled Hamilton Bohannon's 1973 track "Singing a Song for My Mother," it was released as the album's second single in 2003. The songreached number 29 on the US Billboard Hot 100. 

A remix, officially titled the "G-Unit Remix", that featured 50 Cent, Lloyd Banks, and Young Buck, was later released. A video for the song was directed by Sanji. It portrayed Blige fighting and dancing different versions of herself, who all represented her inner emotions and feelings. The video was dedicated to the soldiers in the war. Blige received a nomination for Best Female R&B Vocal Performance at the 46th Grammy Awards for the song.

Track listings

Charts

Weekly charts

Year-end charts

References

External links

2003 singles
Mary J. Blige songs
Songs written by Mary J. Blige
Songs written by Sean Combs
2003 songs
Geffen Records singles